Norwalk Township may refer to:

Norwalk Township, Pottawattamie County, Iowa
Norwalk Township, Huron County, Ohio

Township name disambiguation pages